Nevena Georgieva-Dunja (in , August 25, 1925, Skopje, Kingdom of Yugoslavia – December 16, 1942, Nezhilovo, Macedonia) was a Macedonian Yugoslav Partisan. She participated in the 1941 Yugoslav independence struggle during World War II. At the age of 16 she was the youngest fighter in the Macedonian partisan units, and she was the first woman to be a Macedonian partisan fighter.

Life
Georgieva was born on July 25, 1925 in Skopje, in the Kingdom of Yugoslavia. She became a fighter in the Skopje Partisan Detachment when it was created on August 22, 1941. After the reorganization of the detachment in November 1941, she went to Veles, and then to Strumica, where she helped form the Strumica Partisan Detachment in the summer of 1942. She was sentenced in absentia to 7 years in prison by the occupying powers in May 1942. In September of 1942, she became a fighter in the Veles Partisan Detachment that was named after the politician Dimitar Vlahov.

Georgieva was killed on December 16, 1942 in Veles, during the Bulgarian occupation of North Macedonia, in a confrontation with the Bulgarian police and Bulgarian paramilitary troops, composed of local Slavic inhabitants, while covering the escape of her adult comrades in the guerrilla squad, who abandon her.

Legacy
Georgieva is widely considered a national hero of North Macedonia. Georgieva is featured as a heroine in multiple Macedonian folk songs, notably По поле одат аргати and Пуста останала таја контра чета. She is also the namesake of two elementary schools, Kisela Voda and Nejilovo, as well as one of the student dormitories in Skopje. There are also a number of statues of Nevena Georgieva, including busts in Kisela Voda and in Skopje. A memorial plaque was installed in the Women Fighters Park in Skopje, and another in Nejilovo was unveiled in 2013.

References

1925 births
1942 deaths
Yugoslav Partisans members